Allocybaeina is a monotypic genus of North American spiders in the family Cybaeidae containing the single species, Allocybaeina littlewalteri. It was first described by R. Bennett, C. Copley and D. Copley in 2020, and it has only been found in the United States.

See also
 List of Cybaeidae species

References

Monotypic Cybaeidae genera
Spiders of the United States